RTL Nederland is a Dutch media network, a subsidiary of the RTL Group. The media company is located in Hilversum, although the licences of its TV stations are issued in Luxembourg.

History 
The history of the network dates back to 1989 when dutch minded RTL-Véronique started airing from Luxembourg. At the time commercial television was prohibited in The Netherlands, but by airing from Luxembourg the law could be bypassed. In the beginning the channel only focused on youth, this changed in 1990 when an agreement was made with Joop van den Ende  whose own commercial channel TV10 failed due to the same law  and the name of the channel was changed into RTL 4. In 1993 a second channel was created named RTL 5.

In 1995 the two channels were merged in a new joint-venture with Veronica Association, until then part of the Dutch public broadcasting system. The new joint-venture was named Holland Media Group (HMG) and consisted of RTL 4, RTL 5, Veronica and the radio station HitRadio Veronica. From 1997 till 1998 HMG participated in TV10, together with Saban, but sold its share to Fox. The joint-venture existed until 2001 when the Veronica Association left, leaving their channel and radio station behind, but because they took the trademark the channel and radio station were renamed Yorin.

The company changed its name from Holland Media Group to RTL Nederland in 2004, a year later Yorin was renamed again this time to RTL 7. In 2006 the Yorin radio station was sold to SBS Broadcasting.

As of August 2007 the group entered into a new joint-venture with John de Mol, whose own commercial channel was failing at the time. RTL Nederland acquired the channel and Radio 538, John de Mol's Talpha Media Holding would acquire 26,3% of the shares in RTL Nederland. The acquired channel was renamed RTL 8 that same month. In 2011 John de Mol was forced by the Netherlands Authority for Consumers and Markets to sell his share in RTL Nederland when he and Sanoma acquired competitor SBS Broadcasting, taking with him the radio stations Radio 538, Radio 10 Gold and SLAM!FM.

Acquisitions 
Over the years the group acquired several other companies, including Wentik Events (2010, renamed to RTL Live Entertainment), Bright (2015), Buienradar (2011),  Videoland (2013), Adfactor (2017), BrandDeli (2018), Triade Media (2015).

Proposed merger 
After John de Mol raised his stake in SBS Broadcasting in 2017 to full ownership he sought a partnership with RTL Nederland. In his opinion there wasn't enough space for two major Dutch commercial television networks in the changed media landscape, RTL shut down his offer. However in June 2021 RTL Nederland and Talpa Network announced plans for a merger, pending approval by the European Commission and the Netherlands Authority for Consumers and Markets. In the new conglomerate, RTL Nederland is to hold 70% of the shares and Talpa 30%. Talpa Entertainment Productions and Talpa Concepts won't be a part of the merger. Both parties reasoned that a merger was the only solution to an ever growing presence of foreign media parties, giving space to a single commercial Dutch media company that's capable of producing specifically for the Dutch market. Critics however claimed that the failing of Talpa Network is the reason behind the merger. In January 2022 the Netherlands Authority for Consumers and Markets stated that it could not approve the merger as of yet and that further investigation to the consequences of price, quality and innovation is necessary. On the 30th of January 2023 the Authority announced that it would not approve the merger, citing that the merged company would become too powerful.

Assets

Television 

 RTL 4, oldest channel of the group and their flagship
 RTL 5, focused on reality and youth
 RTL 7, focused on sports and the male demographic
 RTL 8, focused on movies and the female demographic
 RTL Z, focused on news and documentaries
 RTL Crime, digital pay channel focused on crime series and reality
 RTL Lounge, digital pay channel focused and drama
 RTL Telekids, digital pay channel focused on children

Streaming catchup and Video on Demand services 

 RTL XL, catching up service
 Videoland by RTL, an OTT streaming service

Other 

 RTL Live Entertainment
 Ad Alliance, advertisement agency
 RTL Nieuws B.V. news organisation including Buienradar and Bright
  is a Dutch media brand, focussed on technology, design and style.

References

External links 
 Official website 

RTL Group
Mass media companies established in 1995
1995 establishments in the Netherlands